Sirari is a town and ward in Tarime District, Mara Region of northern Tanzania, East Africa. In 2016 the Tanzania National Bureau of Statistics report there were 17,564 people in the ward, from 15,917 in 2012.

Villages / neighborhoods 
The ward has 4 villages and 15 hamlets.

 Sokoni
 Majengo mapya
 Mlimani
 Nyairoma
 Sokoni
 Buriba
 Kenanso
 Nyasoko
 Nyatiti
 Sirari
 Mpakani
 Bondeni
 Forodhani
 Kemwita Wahende
 Nyamorege
 Kanisani
 Gwitanka
 Kanisani
 Nyatoraha

References

Populated places in Mara Region
Tarime District